The Philadelphia Front Page News (previously the Van Stone's Digest ) is an American newspaper, headquartered in Philadelphia, Pennsylvania.  Published online daily, it was created in 2000 by Samuel Van Stone Downing. The Philadelphia Front Page News also publishes the WVSR-AM Newsletter for its readers, viewers, and listeners.

The Front Page News has a readership of about 90,000 and is mostly read by people living in the Philadelphia, Camden, New Jersey, Delaware County, Wilmington, Delaware, Chester, Pennsylvania, Bucks County, New York City, Jersey City, California Harrisburg, Hopewell, Virginia, as well as the Rhode Island area.

The Front Page News is a private founded organization.  The Front Page News is one of the first located online newspapers and television and radio station combinations that allows viewers to read the newspaper, watch video television format and tune to the independent live radio over the Internet.

External links
 Front Page News
 WVSR-AM Newsletter

Newspapers published in Philadelphia
Daily newspapers published in Pennsylvania